Konov (Bulgarian, Russian or Ukrainian: Конов) is a Slavic masculine surname, its feminine counterpart is Konova. It may refer to
Aleksandar Konov (born 1993), Bulgarian football player
Kina Konova (1872–1952), Bulgarian educator, translator, publicist and women's rights activist
Lev Konov (born 1952), Russian composer, conductor and producer
Sergey Konov (born 1948), Uzbekistani swimmer
Vitaly Konov (born 1987), Ukrainian badminton player
Zaurbek Konov (born 1985), Russian football player, twin brother of Aslanbek